A440 or A-440 may refer to:
 A440 (pitch standard)
 A440 highway (Australia), a road in Victoria, Australia
 Quebec Autoroute 440 (Laval)
 Quebec Autoroute 440 (Quebec City)

See also
 Apollo 440, an English band
 Airbus A400M, a military transport aircraft
 Archimedes 440, abbreviated to A440 - one of the Acorn Archimedes range of RISC computers